Sandalia triticea is a species of sea snail, a marine gastropod mollusk in the family Ovulidae, the ovulids, cowry allies or false cowries.

Description

Distribution

References

 Lorenz, F., 2009. -Two new species of Ovulidae from the western Pacific (Gastropoda: Ovulidae). Conchylia 40(3-4): 38-42
 Knudsen J. (1997). Observations on the egg capsule and reproduction of four species of Ovulidae and of Nassarius (Zeuxis) siquijorensis (A. Adams, 1852) (Gastropoda: Prosobranchia) from Hong Kong. In: Morton B, editor. Proceedings of the Eighth International Marine Biological Workshop: The Marine Flora and Fauna of Hong Kong and Southern China. The Marine Flora and Fauna of Hong Kong and Southern China IV. Hong Kong University Press, Hong Kong. pp 361-370. 
 Lorenz F. & Fehse D. (2009) The living Ovulidae. A manual of the families of allied cowries: Ovulidae, Pediculariidae and Eocypraeidae. Hackenheim: Conchbooks.

External links
 Lamarck, J.-B. M. de. (1810). Sur la détermination des espèces parmi les animaux sans vertèbres, et particulièrement parmi les Mollusques testacés. Annales du Muséum d'Histoire Naturelle. 15: 20-40
 Adams, A. (1855). Descriptions of thirty-nine new species of shells, from the collection of Hugh Cuming, Esq. Proceedings of the Zoological Society of London. (1854) 22: 130-138, pl. 28

Ovulidae
Gastropods described in 1810